Carmenta ithacae is a moth of the family Sesiidae. It was described by William Beutenmüller in 1897. It is known from North America, including Florida, Arizona, Illinois, Michigan, Nebraska, New York, Virginia and Wisconsin.

Adults are on wing from late June to July.

The larvae feed on various composites like Helenium species, as well as Aster species.

References

External links
mothphotographersgroup

Sesiidae
Moths described in 1897